Mahle may refer to:
Ernst Mahle (born 1929), Brazilian composer and orchestra conductor
Greg Mahle (born 1993), American baseball player
Melissa Boyle Mahle, writer and former CIA officer
Mahle GmbH, a large German industrial company automotive supplier
MAHLE Powertrain, the engineering services division of Mahle GmbH
Mahle people, a Bangladeshi ethnic group
Tyler Mahle (born 1994), American baseball player

See also

German-language surnames